KNIP may refer to:

 Central Indonesian National Committee (in Indonesian, Komite Nasional Indonesia Pusat)
 the ICAO code for Naval Air Station Jacksonville, in Jacksonville, Florida, United States